Tan Sri Nor Mohamed bin Yakcop (Jawi: نور محمد بن يعقوب; born 24 August 1947) is a Malaysian politician who served as Minister in the Prime Minister's Department, in charge of Economic Planning Unit from 2009 to 2013. He had previously served as Minister of Finance II from 2004 to 2009. He is a member of the Executive Committee of the National Economic Advisory Council.

Career
He served with Bank Negara, the Malaysian central bank from 1968 to 2000. During his time in Bank Negara he was responsible for the implementation of a number of major projects, including
 the implementation of Islamic banking in Malaysia
 the setting-up of the bilateral payments mechanism between Bank Negara Malaysia and Central Banks of South-South countries
 the setting-up of the Rating Agency Malaysia Berhad.

He was also involved in a currency speculation scandal in the early 1990s, where Bank Negara lost up to RM30 billion. No action was taken as he moved on to hold important government positions.

Yakcop was the Special Economic Adviser to former Prime Minister of Malaysia, Tun Dr. Mahathir Mohamad.

In 2002, he was appointed the director of Khazanah Nasional. He played a major role in government-linked companies (GLCs) like United Engineers Malaysia Berhad and Malaysia Airlines. The transformation of the GLCs was something he led on. Following the Asian financial crisis many of the GLCs were mired in debt and rudderless.

Yakcop restored their balance sheets using the Government's sovereign guarantee when necessary to cut down their borrowing costs. He installed new managers in the GLCs, giving them wide latitude to run the corporations honestly. To ensure that they delivered, he introduced key performance indicators and service contracts.

He was a member of the Dewan Negara, the upper house of the Parliament of Malaysia, for two terms before stepping down to run for the Tasek Gelugor parliamentary constituency in Penang in the Malaysian elections on 8 March 2008.

Personal life
He was a student of St. Xavier's Institution in Penang and served as a prefect during his student days.

He is married to Puan Sri Fawziah Begum Abu Bakar, a former welfare officer. The couple have three children.

Election results

Honours

Honours of Malaysia
  :
  Officer of the Order of the Defender of the Realm (KMN) (1989)
  Companion of the Order of Loyalty to the Crown of Malaysia (JSM) (1993)
  Commander of the Order of Loyalty to the Crown of Malaysia (PSM) – Tan Sri (2000)
  :
  Knight Grand Commander of the Order of the Life of the Crown of Kelantan (SJMK) – Dato' (2004)
  :
  Knight Grand Commander of the Order of the Crown of Perlis (SPMP) – Dato' Seri (2006)
  :
  Grand Knight of the Order of Sultan Ahmad Shah of Pahang (SSAP) – Dato' Sri (2004)
  :
  Knight Grand Companion of the Order of Sultan Mizan Zainal Abidin of Terengganu (SSMZ) – Dato' Seri (2005)
  :
  Knight Grand Commander of the Order of Loyalty to Negeri Sembilan (SPNS) – Dato' Seri Utama (2007)
  :
  Member of the Order of the Defender of the State (DJN)
  Officer of the Order of the Defender of the State (DSPN) – Dato' (1997)
  Commander of the Order of the Defender of State (DGPN) – Dato' Seri (2003)
  :
  Member of the Exalted Order of Malacca (DSM)
  Grand Commander of the Exalted Order of Malacca (DGSM) – Datuk Seri (2006)
  :
  Knight Commander of the Most Exalted Order of the Star of Sarawak (PNBS) – Dato Sri (2008)
  :
  Knight Commander of the Order of Loyalty to Sultan Abdul Halim Mu'adzam Shah (DHMS) – Dato' Paduka (2007)
  :
  Companion of the Order of the Crown of Johor (SMJ)

References

 
 
 

Malaysian Muslims
Malaysian politicians of Indian descent
Knights Commander of the Most Exalted Order of the Star of Sarawak
People from Penang
Living people
United Malays National Organisation politicians
1947 births
University of Malaya alumni
Catholic University of Leuven alumni
Members of the Dewan Negara
Members of the Dewan Rakyat
Government ministers of Malaysia
Commanders of the Order of Loyalty to the Crown of Malaysia
Economy ministers of Malaysia
Finance ministers of Malaysia
Companions of the Order of Loyalty to the Crown of Malaysia
Officers of the Order of the Defender of the Realm
Companions of the Order of the Crown of Johor